The 2012 williamhill.com UK Championship was a professional ranking snooker tournament that took place between 1–9 December 2012 at the Barbican Centre in York, England. It was the fifth ranking event of the 2012/2013 season.

For the first time in the history of snooker three maximum breaks were made in a ranking tournament, albeit at different venues. Andy Hicks made the 93rd official maximum break during his round 2 qualifying match against Daniel Wells. This was Hicks' first 147 break. Just one day later Jack Lisowski compiled the 94th official maximum break during his round 3 qualifying match against Chen Zhe. This was Lisowski's first 147 break. John Higgins made the 95th official maximum break during his last 16 match against Mark Davis. This was Higgins' seventh 147 break. It also took the total number of maximum breaks for the season to seven.

Judd Trump was the defending champion, but he lost 5–6 against Mark Joyce in the last 32.

Mark Selby won his third ranking title by defeating Shaun Murphy 10–6 in the final. This was the tournament's first all-English final since 1992, when Jimmy White defeated John Parrott 16–9. By reaching the final Selby also regained number one position in the rankings from Trump.

Prize fund
The breakdown of prize money for this year is shown below:

Winner: £125,000
Runner-up: £50,000
Semi-final: £25,000
Quarter-final: £17,000
Last 16: £11,000
Last 32: £7,500
Last 48: £5,500
Last 64: £2,000

Non-televised highest break: £500
Televised highest break: £3,500
Non-televised maximum break: £2,500
Televised maximum break: £10,000
Total: £637,500

Main draw

Final

Qualifying
These matches were held between 20 and 23 November 2012 at the World Snooker Academy in Sheffield, England.

Century breaks

Televised stage centuries

 147, 116  John Higgins
 134, 101  Ali Carter
 131, 121  Marco Fu
 131, 104, 102  Stephen Maguire
 130, 122, 105  Shaun Murphy
 129, 127, 112, 105, 100  Neil Robertson
 121, 106, 105, 103, 101  Mark Selby
 120  Stuart Bingham

 106, 103, 101  Mark Davis
 106  Ding Junhui
 105  Mark Williams
 104  Judd Trump
 103  Mark King
 102  Liang Wenbo
 101  Barry Hawkins
 100  Ryan Day

Qualifying stage centuries

 147, 131, 104, 100  Jack Lisowski
 147  Andy Hicks
 141, 136  Steve Davis
 140, 103  Ben Woollaston
 138  Mark Joyce
 136, 119, 110, 110, 103  Luca Brecel
 135, 102  Rod Lawler
 133  Tom Ford
 132, 123, 105  Marco Fu
 130  Dave Harold
 129  Yu Delu
 128  Liam Highfield
 127, 124, 118  David Gilbert

 120, 104  Thepchaiya Un-Nooh
 120  Ryan Day
 115, 111  Sam Baird
 113, 105  Liang Wenbo
 113  Kurt Maflin
 111  Marcus Campbell
 104  Mark King
 103, 102  Pankaj Advani
 102, 101  Daniel Wells
 102  Xiao Guodong
 101  Jamie O'Neill
 101  Joe Perry

References

External links
UKC2012 pictures by MoniqueLimbos at Photobucket

2012
UK Championship
Championship (snooker)
UK Championship